Zvi Studinski, born 16 February 1927, was an Israeli footballer, who played for Maccabi Tel Aviv and for Israel.

Career
Studinski was born in Berlin in 1927 and immigrated with his family to Eretz Israel after the rise of the Nazi Party. He joined Maccabi Tel Aviv's youth team in 1943 and moved to the senior team  in 1945. With the senior team, Studinski won 5 league championships and 4 cups, including scoring goals in the 1954 and 1955 cup finals. Studinski retired from football in 1957.

Studinski played five FIFA-recognized matches for the Israel national football team, between 1949 and 1954, including taking part in Israel's first great victory, a 5–1 thrashing of Turkey, in which he played as midfielder and assisted one goal before being substituted in the second half, as well as playing in other 4 non FIFA recognized matches, scoring one goal in the 3–3 draw against a Cypriot XI on 23 July 1949.

Honours
League Championship (5):
 1946–47, 1949–50, 1951–52, 1953–54, 1955–56
Israel State Cup (4):
 1946, 1947 Palestine Cup, 1954 , 1955

External links
 Studinski, Zvi, National Team  IFA
 Zvi Studinski Maccabi Tel Aviv

References

1927 births
2012 deaths
Israeli footballers
Maccabi Tel Aviv F.C. players
Footballers from Berlin
Association football forwards
Burials at Yarkon Cemetery
Jewish emigrants from Nazi Germany to Mandatory Palestine